Una chica casi decente is a 1971 Spanish comedy film directed by Germán Lorente and starring Rocío Jurado.

Cast
 Rocío Jurado - Silvia
 Adolfo Celi - El Duque
 Máximo Valverde - Daniel
 Mirta Miller
 Manuel Gómez Bur
 Luis Sánchez Polack
 José Luis Coll
 Mary Paz Pondal (as Mari Paz Pondal)
 Rafael Hernández
 Valentín Tornos
 Juanito Navarro
 Tomás Blanco
 Manuel de Blas
 Frank Braña

References

External links

1971 films
1970s Spanish-language films
1971 comedy films
Films with screenplays by Rafael J. Salvia
Spanish comedy films
1970s Spanish films